(Cfr, Cfr methyltransferase, Cfr rRNA methyltransferase) is an enzyme with systematic name . This enzyme catalyses the following chemical reaction

 2 S-adenosyl-L-methionine + adenine2503 in 23S rRNA  2 S-adenosyl-L-homocysteine + 2,8-dimethyladenine2503 in 23S rRNA

This enzyme contains an [4Fe-S] cluster.

References

External links 

EC 2.1.1